Rosenska Pokalen/Svenska Fotbollpokalen was a short-lived Swedish football cup tournament played between 1899 and 1903. The tournament was known as Rosenska Pokalen between 1899 and 1902, and as Svenska Fotbollpokalen in 1903, when the cup was played twice, once in the spring and once in the autumn. The competition was merged into Svenska Mästerskapet in 1904.

Previous winners

Cup champions

References

 
Defunct football competitions in Sweden
1899 establishments in Sweden
1903 disestablishments in Sweden
Recurring sporting events established in 1899